Anto Drobnjak (Cyrillic: Анто Дробњак; born 21 September 1968) is a Montenegrin former professional footballer who played as a forward. He was one of two top scorers of the First League of Yugoslavia in 1993 when he played for Red Star Belgrade. Internationally, he played for FR Yugoslavia national team in the qualification for the 1998 FIFA World Cup, although he was not selected to the country's squad for the final tournament.

Club career

Budućnost
Drobnjak joined Budućnost ahead of the 1987–88 season. He made his professional debut under coach Stanko "Špaco" Poklepović, during a time when Budućnost fielded their most accomplished generation at the time; Drobnjak's teammates at Budućnost included Dragoje Leković, Branko Brnović, Željko Petrović, Predrag Mijatović, and Dejan Savićević. Drobnjak later attributed his early development to "Špaco" Poklepović:

Red Star Belgrade
Drobnjak joined Red Star Belgrade ahead of the 1992–93 season, after which he was the league's top scorer along with Vojvodina's Vesko Mihajlović. On 15 May 1993, he scored the winning goal in the final of the 1993 Yugoslav Cup, in which Red Star beat Partizan 1–0. He was Red Star's top scorer in the 1993–94 season along with teammate Ilija Ivić, and was fifth highest goal scorer in the league that season.

Bastia
Amidst international sanctions against Yugoslavia, Drobnjak asked Red Star's sports director Dragan Džajić if there was any opportunity could leave both the club and country. Džajić got word of Bastia's search for a classic center forward, and after negotiations through Džajić, Drobnjak signed a three-year contract with Bastia in 1994. Under coach Frédéric Antonetti, he spent the following three seasons at the club, scoring 50 goals in 100 league games. On 3 May 1995, Drobnjak scored a goal in the 1995 Coupe de la Ligue Final against Paris Saint-Germain, although it was denied by the referee. He signed a new three-year contract with Bastia in 1996. At the end of the 1996–97 season, Drobnjak was the sixth highest goal scorer in the league and Bastia finished in seventh overall. As a result, he received offers from Olympique de Marseille and Lens, but he ultimately chose Lens due to Bastia's bitter rivalry with Marseille.

Lens
In 1997, Drobnjak switched to fellow French club Lens, helping them win the league in his debut season under coach Daniel Leclercq. On 22 August 1997, Leclercq gave Drobnjak the green light to start against Olympique de Marseille in spite of a lingering back injury; Drobnjak went on to score a hat-trick in a 2–3 away win for Lens. On 15 November 1997, he scored a hat-trick in a 5–4 win against AS Cannes. He was the fourth highest goal scorer in the league that season.

Later career
He subsequently moved to Japan and played for Gamba Osaka. After a year, Drobnjak returned to France and joined Sochaux. He also spent one season at Martigues, before retiring in 2002.

International career
Between 1996 and 1998, Drobnjak earned seven caps and scored three times for FR Yugoslavia. He made his debut on 6 October 1996 in a 8–1 away win against Faroe Islands under coach Slobodan Santrač during the 1998 FIFA World Cup qualification. On 24 February 1998, Drobnjak scored a goal in a 3–1 friendly loss against Argentina at Estadio José María Minella. However, he was not selected to Yugoslavia's final squad for the 1998 FIFA World Cup. Multiple newspapers at the time expressed surprise at Drobnjak's absence in Yugoslavia's squad at the 1998 World Cup. His final international was an April 1998 friendly match against South Korea.

Post-playing career
Drobnjak served as assistant manager to Branko Brnović at Montenegro from 2011 to 2015.

Career statistics

Honours
Red Star Belgrade
 FR Yugoslavia Cup: 1992–93

Lens
 Championnat de France: 1997–98

Individual
 First League of FR Yugoslavia top scorer: 1992–93

References

External links
 
 
 
 

1968 births
Living people
People from Bijelo Polje
Association football forwards
Yugoslav footballers
Serbia and Montenegro footballers
Serbia and Montenegro international footballers
FK Jedinstvo Bijelo Polje players
FK Budućnost Podgorica players
Montenegrin footballers
Red Star Belgrade footballers
SC Bastia players
RC Lens players
Gamba Osaka players
FC Sochaux-Montbéliard players
FC Martigues players
Yugoslav First League players
First League of Serbia and Montenegro players
Ligue 1 players
J1 League players
Ligue 2 players
Serbia and Montenegro expatriate footballers
Expatriate footballers in France
Serbia and Montenegro expatriate sportspeople in France
Expatriate footballers in Japan
Serbia and Montenegro expatriate sportspeople in Japan